The 1996 Purdue Boilermakers football team represented Purdue University as a member of the Big Ten Conference during the 1996 NCAA Division I-A football season. Led by Jim Colletto in his sixth and final season as head coach, the Boilermakers compiled an overall record of 3–8 with a mark of 2–6 in conference play, placing eighth in the Big Ten. Purdue played home games at Ross–Ade Stadium in West Lafayette, Indiana. 

Purdue started the season 0–3, averaging under seven points per game. Over the final eight games the Boilermakers went 3–5, failing to qualify for a bowl game for the 12 straight season. The Boilermakers also failed to win a road game.

Brian Alford received numerous postseason accolades, including First Team All-Big Ten honors by both the coaches and the media, and broke the Purdue record for most receiving touchdowns in a single season. Senior captain Emmett Zitelli was selected to the Second Team All-Big team by both the coaches and the media. After the season, none of the Boilermakers were selected in the 1997 NFL Draft, Zitelli signed as an undrafted free agent.

Preseason
In 1995 the Purdue Boilermakers had the second best season in the Colletto era. The team finished with a 4–6–1 regular season record, failing to qualify for a postseason bowl game for the 11th straight year. The Boilermakers struggled to win games, facing what was rated as the third most difficult schedule in the nation in 1995. However, Purdue did finish first in the Big Ten in rushing offense.

Going into 1996, there was doubt that Purdue could successfully replace all-time leading rusher Mike Alstott and have a winning season. Entering the season, Colletto thought that each of his quarterbacks would be a contributor on offense, electing Rick Trefzger as the team's starting quarterback, and moving former tailback, Edwin Watson to fullback to replace Alstott.

Schedule

Roster

Depth chart

Game summaries

NC State
 Edwin Watson 29 rushes, 227 yards

Minnesota
 Kendall Matthews 30 rushes, 131 yards

Michigan

    
    
    

Purdue's first win versus Michigan since 1984

Statistics

Passing

Rushing

Receiving

References

Purdue
Purdue Boilermakers football seasons
Purdue Boilermakers football